Novomoskovsky (masculine), Novomoskovskaya (feminine), or Novomoskovskoye (neuter) may refer to:
Novomoskovsky Administrative Okrug, an administrative okrug of Moscow, Russia
Novomoskovsky District, a district of Tula Oblast, Russia
Novomoskovsky (rural locality), a rural locality (a khutor) in Voronezh Oblast
Novomoskovskoye, a rural locality (a selo) in Chelyabinsk Oblast

See also 
 Novomoskovsk (disambiguation)